Michaël Llodra was the defending champion, but he lost in quarterfinals to Robin Söderling. Söderling reached the final, where he defeated Marin Čilić 6–7(8–10), 6–3, 6–3 to claim his third title of the year and ninth of his career.

Seeds
The top four seeds received a bye into the second round.

Qualifying

Draw

Finals

Top half

Bottom half

References
 Main Draw
 Qualifying Draw

Singles 2011
Open 13 - Singles

nl:ATP-toernooi van Marseille 2011